Hiden is a surname. Notable people with the surname include:

Markus Hiden, Austrian professional footballer 
Martin Hiden, Austrian professional footballer 
Philip W. Hiden, American businessman and mayor
Rodolphe Hiden, Austrian professional footballer

See also
Haydn (disambiguation)